The robust mulch-slider (Lerista terdigitata) is a species of skink found in South Australia and Western Australia.

References

Lerista
Reptiles described in 1926
Taxa named by Hampton Wildman Parker